Nasza may refer to:

Nasza TV, was a Polish supraregional television network
Nasza Klasa or NK.pl, a Polish school-based social networking service used by alumni and students
Nasza Księgarnia (Our Bookstore), the oldest publisher of children books in Poland

See also
Nasa (disambiguation)
Naza (disambiguation)